The AGS-17 Plamya (Russian: Пламя; Flame) is a Soviet-designed automatic grenade launcher in service worldwide.

Description
The AGS-17 is a heavy infantry support weapon designed to operate from a tripod or mounted on an installation or vehicle. The AGS-17 fires 30 mm grenades in either direct or indirect fire to provide suppressive and lethal fire support against soft-skinned or fortified targets.

The weapon uses a blowback mechanism to sustain operation. Rounds are fired through a removable (to reduce barrel stress) rifled barrel.

The standard metal ammunition drum contains 29 linked rounds.

The tripod is equipped with fine levelling gear for indirect fire trajectories.

Development
Development of the AGS-17 (Avtomaticheskiy Granatomyot Stankovyi—Automatic Grenade launcher, Mounted) started in the USSR in 1965 by the OKB-16 design bureau (now known as the KB Tochmash), under the leadership of Alexander F. Kornyakov.

This lightweight weapon was to provide infantry with close to medium range fire support against enemy personnel and unarmored targets, like trucks, half-tracks, jeeps and sandbag-protected machine-gun nests. The first prototypes of the new weapon entered trials in 1969, with mass production commencing in 1971. The AGS-17 was widely operated and well-liked by Soviet troops in Afghanistan as a ground support weapon or as a vehicle weapon on improvised mounts installed on armoured personnel carriers and trucks.

A special airborne version of the AGS-17, the AG-17A, was developed for installation on helicopters, including the Mi-24 Hind in gun pods and the Mil Mi-8 on door mounts. This weapon had a thick aluminium jacket on the barrel and used a special mount and an electric remotely controlled trigger.

It is still in use with the Russian army as a direct fire support weapon for infantry troops; it is also installed in several vehicle mounts and turrets along with machine guns, guided rocket launchers and sighting equipment. It is being replaced by the AGS-30 launcher, which fires the same ammunition, but weighs only 16 kg unloaded on the tripod and has an upgraded blowback action.

Variants
AG-17A - remotely controlled aircraft-mounted version with an electric trigger mechanism.
AGS-17D - remotely controlled vehicle-mounted version with an electric trigger mechanism.

RGSh-30
Ukrainian company Precision Systems developed a miniaturized handheld version of AGS-17 called RGSh-30 "in order to create a grenade launcher that could respond to the needs of Ukrainian units and special forces operating in the Donbas". RGSh-30 is designed to disable armored vehicles. that can be carried like an assault rifle. RGSh-30 uses magazines with five 30mm VOG-17 grenades.

Precision Systems plans to develop versions using 20mm, 25mm, and 40mm grenades.

Ammunition
The AGS-17 fires 30×29 mm belted cartridges with a steel cartridge case. Two types of ammunition are commonly fired from the AGS-17. The VOG-17M is the version of the original 30 mm grenade ammunition, which is currently available and has a basic high explosive fragmentation warhead. The VOG-30 is similar, but contains a better explosive filling and an enhanced fragmentation design that greatly increases the effective blast radius. New improved VOG-30D grenade was taken into service in 2013 for use with AGS-17 and AGS-30 grenade launchers.

The Bulgarian weapons manufacturer Arcus produces AR-ROG hand grenades based on VOG-17 cartridges and UZRGM (Russian: УЗРГМ), which is also a Soviet design of fuse.

 VOG-17M (HE)
 IO-30 (HE)
 IO-30TP (Practice)
 VOG-30 (HE)
 VOG-30D (HE)
 VUS-30 (Smoke)

Users

Current
 
 
  – imported

  – a modernized version, the AGL-30M, produced locally by Arsenal AD
 
  – produced by Norinco based on captured examples from Mujahideen groups.
 
 
 : Used during Cenepa war 1995.
 
 
 
  – produced under license
 
 
  – designated the M93
 
 
 
 
 
  – designated the M93 Produced under license.

 : used by the Sudanese Armed Forces, some captured by the Sudan People's Liberation Movement-North
 
 

  – Made under license in Z125 Factory Known under the Vietnamese industrial name of SPL-17.

Former
  – designated 30 KrKK AGS-17, replaced by the HK GMG in 2005
  – used in the 1990s, now replaced by the HK GMG
  – passed on to successor states

See also
 AGS-30, first successor
 AGS‑40 Balkan, second successor using caseless high-explosive 40mm 7P39 grenades.
 GA-40 similar weapon 
 HK GMG, similar weapon
 Howa Type 96, similar weapon
 Milkor MGL, another South African 40 mm grenade launcher
 Mk 19 grenade launcher, similar weapon
 SB LAG 40
 Type 87 grenade launcher, used by the People's Liberation Army
 Vektor Y3 AGL
 XM174 grenade launcher, similar weapon

References

External links 
 

Automatic grenade launchers
Cold War weapons of the Soviet Union
Grenade launchers of the Soviet Union
KBP Instrument Design Bureau products
Military equipment introduced in the 1970s